Louveigné is a village of Wallonia and a district of the municipality of Sprimont, located in the province of Liège, Belgium.

The village of Banneux lies on its territory.

External links
 

Former municipalities of Liège Province
Sprimont